Rudy Israel Rochman (born ) is a Jewish-Israeli rights activist.

Early life
Rochman's maternal grandparents were Sephardic Jews from North Africa and his paternal grandparents were Ashkenazi Jews. According to him, both sides of his family are of the tribe of Levi. He was born in Paris, France, but moved to Israel when he was three years old. Two years later, his family moved to the United States. In 2000, at the age of seven, Rochman experienced anti-Semitism after being physically removed from a bus in London, England, for being Jewish; he has described this experience as the origin for his will to defend Jews worldwide.

Rochman served in the Paratroopers Brigade of the Israel Defense Forces from 2011 to 2013. Following his discharge, he attended the University of California, Los Angeles, but later transferred to Columbia University after seeing that it was named the most anti-Semitic university in North America.

Activism
Rochman is a noted speaker and writer on Jewish rights. He frequently speaks at college campuses and to organizations that are pro-Israel. He is also known for his work as a Jewish and Israel rights activist on social media, where he has gained thousands of followers and subscribers across platforms and services such as Facebook, Instagram, YouTube, and Twitter.

During his studies at Columbia University in New York City, Rochman founded the school's chapter for Students Supporting Israel and served as the president. In 2018, he received the "36 Under 36" award as a recognition for his influence as a young leader. In 2020, Rochman ran in the World Zionist Congress elections as part of the Vision slate. He currently serves on the board of The Israel Innovation Fund, a philanthropic organization, and as part of the leadership team of HaBayit, a platform that aims to bring unity through dialogue between Israelis and Palestinians.

Rochman has been working on a documentary series called We Were Never Lost, which interviews "lesser-known Jewish communities".

Arrest in Nigeria
In July 2021, Rochman and two other Israeli filmmakers were arrested by Nigeria's secret police, the State Security Service, while filming the We Were Never Lost documentary. Although not having political motives for their visit, they were suspected to be politically involved with the conflict between Biafran separatists and the Nigerian government after meeting with the Igbo Jewish community. They were released after being imprisoned for 20 days in reportedly "horrendous conditions" and were "officially cleared of all wrongdoing".

Views
Rochman is a Zionist. His argument about the State of Israel's right to exist is not based on religion but centres around the point of view that the Jews are a people that are indigenous and as a group rooted to its land, and that they have always wanted to return there since their expulsion by the Roman Empire. He views Zionism as a movement of decolonization and believes that self-determination must involve being able to control, protect, and self-identify with the Land of Israel.
 
Rochman has notably stated that, although "Jewish people's connection to a higher power and Torah is an essential part of their identity", Judaism is not a religion and refers to it as "a portable suitcase" that carries different elements of the Jewish identity, such as their culture, traditions, way of life, and "a connection to a higher power". He explains that religion is considered a belief system in a deity or god that can spread across borders and people-hoods, whereas if a Jew rejects the notion of God and the Torah or considers themselves to be atheist or agnostic, they are still part of the Jewish people.

Rochman opposes the two-state solution as the solution for the Israeli–Palestinian conflict. In his opinion, it does not fulfill the aspirations of both Jews and Palestinians. To him, thinking that the groups can't co-exist and are exclusive to each other only maintains the conflict; Rochman believes that neither of the populations can be "liberated" "without liberation for the other" and both groups should build together "a just civilization as one that works for all".

Rochman is also against the United States foreign aid to Israel. He views it as making Israel dependent of U.S. military supply and holds Israel from being militarily self-sustaining, which he sees as too unstable preparation for the future.

Rochman has criticized the way intersectionality has been misused as a tactic by movements critical of Israel such as SJP to "pursue its agenda of demonizing Israel" and "build alliances" with minority groups such as the LGBT community by equating their unattached experienced injustices to the Israeli–Palestinian conflict. He is also a critic of the Boycott, Divestment and Sanctions movement. He believes that the movement's agenda is rooted in anti-Semitism and that the Boycott, Divestment and Sanctions movement has contributed to the rise in anti-Semitic incidents on college campuses.

Personal life
Rochman is fluent in Hebrew, English, and French. In a 2017 interview, he stated that he is a dual citizen of Israel and France and has an American green card.

See also
 Vision for Israel

References

1993 births
Living people
Israeli military personnel
21st-century Israeli military personnel
20th-century French Jews
French Sephardi Jews
Israeli people of French-Jewish descent
Israeli Sephardi Jews
Israeli people of Polish-Jewish descent
Israeli people of Moroccan-Jewish descent
Columbia College (New York) alumni